Benedetto Brin (17 May 1833 in Turin, Piedmont24 May 1898 in Rome, Lazio) was an Italian naval administrator and politician.

Biography
Born in Turin, he worked with distinction as a naval engineer until the age of forty. In 1873, Admiral Simone Antonio Saint-Bon, Italy's Naval Minister, appointed him undersecretary of state. The two men collaborated on major projects: Saint-Bon conceived a type of ship, Brin made the plans and directed its construction.

On the advent of the Left to power in 1876, Brin was appointed Naval Minister by Agostino Depretis, a capacity in which he continued the policies of Saint-Bon, while enlarging and completing the project in such way as to form the first organic scheme for the development of the Italian fleet. Through his initiative, the Italian naval industry, almost non-existent in 1873, made rapid progress.

During his eleven years in the ministry (1876–1878 with Depretis, 1884–1891 with Depretis and Francesco Crispi, 1896–1898 with Antonio Starabba, Marchese di Rudinì), he succeeded in creating large private shipyards, engine works and metallurgical works for the production of armour, steel plates and guns.

In 1892, he entered the Giovanni Giolitti cabinet as Minister of Foreign Affairs, accompanying, in that capacity, King Umberto I and Queen Margherita to Potsdam, but chose not to act against France on the occasion of the massacre of Italian workmen at Aigues-Mortes. He died while Naval Minister in the Rudini cabinet.

Commemoration

 A  named for him was launched by the Regia Marina in 1901.
 The  was named after him.
 Plaque dedicated to Benedetto Brin on Via Santi Apostoli, Rome.

Footnotes

References
 
 

1833 births
1898 deaths
Politicians from Turin
People from the Kingdom of Sardinia
Historical Left politicians
Foreign ministers of Italy
Deputies of Legislature XII of the Kingdom of Italy
Deputies of Legislature XIII of the Kingdom of Italy
Deputies of Legislature XIV of the Kingdom of Italy
Deputies of Legislature XV of the Kingdom of Italy
Deputies of Legislature XVI of the Kingdom of Italy
Deputies of Legislature XVII of the Kingdom of Italy
Deputies of Legislature XVIII of the Kingdom of Italy
Deputies of Legislature XIX of the Kingdom of Italy
Deputies of Legislature XX of the Kingdom of Italy
Military personnel from Turin
19th-century Italian engineers
Italian naval architects
19th-century Italian military personnel
Engineers from Turin